Springstone can mean:

 Springer (architecture), the bottom-most element of an arch
 Springstone (material), an exceptionally hard, dark stone used in Shona sculpture